Bermuda competed at the 2015 Pan American Games in Toronto, Ontario, Canada from July 10 to 26, 2015. In April 2015, Carlos Lee was named as the chef de mission for the team.

Originally, a squad of seventeen athletes (nine men and eight women) over seven sports was announced on June 16, 2015 by the Bermuda Olympic Association. However, after being originally named to the team, athlete Shianne Smith was dropped. This was done because new qualification standards were set up to reduce the quota from 1,100 to 680 (the original amount allocated to the sport). This mean only nine men and seven women competed for Bermuda, a total of 16 athletes. Swimmer Julian Fletcher was the flagbearer for the team during the opening ceremony.

Competitors
The following table lists Bermuda's delegation per sport and gender.

Medalists
The following competitors from Bermuda won medals at the games. In the by discipline sections below, medalists' names are bolded.

| style="text-align:left; width:78%; vertical-align:top;"|

| style="text-align:left; width:22%; vertical-align:top;"|

Athletics

Bermuda qualified a total of five athletes (five men).

Men
Track events

Field events

Cycling

Bermuda qualified one female cyclist. The country was later reallocated an additional male cyclist.

Road

Equestrian

Bermuda qualified one athlete in dressage and two athletes in jumping, for a total of three competitors.

Dressage

Jumping

Gymnastics

Bermuda qualified one gymnast.

Artistic
Women

Qualification Legend: Q = Qualified to apparatus final

Sailing

Bermuda qualified one sailor in the laser standard event. The country later received a wildcard in the laser event.

Swimming

Bermuda qualified two swimmers (one male and one female).

Triathlon

Bermuda qualified one female triathlete.

Women

See also
Bermuda at the 2015 Parapan American Games
Bermuda at the 2016 Summer Olympics

References

Nations at the 2015 Pan American Games
P
2015